Ed Schwartz may refer to:
Ed Schwartz (1946–2009), Chicago media personality
Eddie Schwartz (born 1949), Canadian songwriter and record producer
Eduard Schwartz (1858–1940), classical philologist
Eduardo Schwartz (born 1940), finance academic